The Țarina mine is a large mine located in the west of Romania in Alba County. Țarina represents a large gold deposit with estimated reserves of 1.52 million oz of gold and 5.59 million oz of silver.

References 

Gold mines in Romania